KSWA 1330 AM is a radio station licensed to Graham, Texas. The station airs a News Talk format in a simulcast with KROO Breckenridge, Texas. Both stations are owned by Terry and Kay Slavens, through licensee For the Love of the Game Broadcasting, LLC.

References

External links
KSWA's official website

News and talk radio stations in the United States
SWA